Jane Kiggundu, is a Ugandan lawyer and judge on the High Court of Uganda. She was appointed to that court by president Yoweri Museveni, in May 2008.

Background and education
She graduated from the Faculty of Law of Makerere University, Uganda's largest and oldest public university, with a Bachelor of Laws degree. She then obtained a Diploma in Legal Practice from the Law Development Centre, in Kampala, Uganda's capital city. Following that, she was admitted to the Uganda Bar.

Career
Beginning circa 2000, Ms Kiggundu took up employment in the Uganda Ministry of Justice and Constitutional Affairs. Between 2003 and 2007, she served as the Administrator General, in an acting capacity. She then served as the Solicitor General from 2007 until 2008, also in acting capacity.

While on the High Court, she served as the executive director of the Judicial Studies Institute, before she served in the Family Division of the court. As of May 2017, she was serving in the International Crimes Division of the High Court. She was a member of the three-judge tribunal that tried 14 men who were accused of carrying out the murders of Muslim clerics in Uganda, between 2014 and 2015. The other two judges on the panel were  Justice Ezekiel Muhanguzi (lead judge) and Justice Percy Tuhaise (member).

Family
In 1988, Jane married Patrick Kiggundu, a Ugandan attorney, who at one time served as the Corporate Secretary of the New Vision Group, and was a Member of Parliament for Kyotera Constituency. They had three children together. Patrick fathered another four children with other partners. Patrick died in August 2013, after spending 15 years in a wheelchair, following injuries sustained in an automobile accident which occurred June 1998.

See also
Monica Mugenyi
Lydia Mugambe
Ministry of Justice and Constitutional Affairs (Uganda)

References

External links
I Did Not Abandon My Husband - Justice Jane Kiggundu

20th-century Ugandan lawyers
21st-century Ugandan lawyers
Living people
1960s births
Ugandan women lawyers
Ugandan women judges
Makerere University alumni
Law Development Centre alumni
People from Mbarara District
People from Western Region, Uganda
Justices of the High Court of Uganda
21st-century women judges